Ray L. Smith is a highly decorated retired United States Marine Corps major general.  Smith was a combat veteran — receiving the Navy Cross for his heroic actions during the Vietnam War, as well as two Silver Stars, the Bronze Star, and three Purple Hearts. Smith retired from the Marine Corps in 1999 after almost 34 years of service.  In 2003, after nearly four years of retirement, Smith went to Iraq with the 1st Marine Division; and penned an eyewitness account of the march from Kuwait to Baghdad — The March Up: Taking Baghdad with the 1st Marine Division.

Marine Corps career
Smith is a native of Oklahoma. He enlisted in the Marine Corps in Montana in December 1965. He graduated as the Platoon and Series Honorman at Marine Corps Recruit Depot, San Diego in 1966. In March 1967, he graduated from Officer Candidates School and from The Basic School in August 1967.

Vietnam War
Smith deployed for his 1st tour to Republic of Vietnam with the 1st Marine Division from 7 October 1967 to 25 October 1968. During this time Lt. Smith served as a rifle platoon commander (4 months) and company commander (9 months) in Alpha Co, 1st Battalion, 1st Marines, seeing combat action in Hue, Khe Sanh, the Rockpile, Con Thien, "Dodge City" and south of Da Nang. He was awarded the Silver Star for his actions during the Tet Offensive. He was awarded a second Silver Star for actions on hill 689 at KheSanh in early July. His next assignment was in the 5th Marine Division at Camp Pendleton, California where he served in 3/28 as a Platoon Commander, Company Commander and as interim Aide for General Ross Dwyer. In November 1969, Lt. Smith was assigned to a one-year Vietnamese Language School in Arlington, Virginia. In late 1970, he returned to Camp Pendleton for duty on an Interrogation Team for four months and was then assigned to 2/5 until he was sent to the John F. Kennedy School of Special Warfare at Ft. Bragg, North Carolina. Captain Smith returned to Vietnam in November 1971 for duty with the Marine Advisory Unit. He was with the Vietnamese Marines during the Easter Offensive and Counter Offensive of 1972.

Navy Cross Citation
Captain Ray L. Smith was awarded the Navy Cross for his actions on April 1, 1972, when he was acting as an advisor to the Vietnamese Marine Corps. His citation reads:

1st Silver Star Citation

2nd Silver Star Citation

Post-Vietnam
After this tour Captain Smith was assigned as a student at the Amphibious Warfare School in Quantico, Virginia and then, from 1973 to 1976, as a company XO, SPC and tactics instructor at The Basic School. In July 1976, he was ordered to MEPCOM at Ft. Sheridan, Illinois, where he served two years as the secretary to the General Staff. He was promoted to major in August 1977.

Major Smith was selected to participate in the Bootstrap Program and reported to Oklahoma State in August 1978. He earned a bachelor's degree in Asian studies in January 1980 and was then transferred to the Armed Forces Staff College in Norfolk, Virginia.

In July 1980, Major Smith reported to Camp Lejeune, North Carolina and was assigned as the executive officer (XO)  of 2nd Battalion, 8th Marines until July 1981 when he was assigned as the operation officer (S-3) of the 8th Marine Regiment. In 1983, now lieutenant colonel Smith, after assignments as the executive officer of the 8th Marine Regiment and as the Assistant Chief of Staff (G-3) OPS of the 2nd Marine Division, took command of the 2nd Battalion, 8th Marine Regiment. He commanded BLT 2/8 in Grenada during Operation Urgent Fury and Beirut.

Smith next attended the Naval War College in Newport, Rhode Island, where he earned a master's degree in military science. While there, he also earned a master's degree in international relations from Salve Regina College. In July 1985, he reported to Headquarters Marine Corps for assignments in training and then in Operations. Returning to Camp Lejeune in May 1988, Lieutenant colonel Smith took command of the 8th Marine Regiment from colonel John J. Sheehan on 17 May 1988. He was promoted to Colonel in November 1988. Smith relinquished command of 8th Marines to Col Larry S. Schmidt on 19 June 1990. In July 1990, Colonel Smith was assigned to the Joint Staff at The Pentagon where he was Chief, Asia-Pacific Branch, J5. He was selected for promotion to brigadier general in December 1991.

As a general officer, Smith's his assignments were: Deputy Commanding General (CG), Marine Corps Bases, Japan; CG, 3rd Marine Division; Assistant Chief of Staff for Plans and Policy, CJ-5, Combined Forces Command, United States Forces Korea; Deputy CG, II MEF; CG, Marine Corps Base, Camp Lejeune, North Carolina.

Major General Smith retired on September 1, 1999. On his last day of active duty, he gave the Convocation address at Campbell University and received an honorary Doctorate of Laws.

In retirement
Since retiring, MajGen. Smith opened a consulting business, E-tool Enterprises, and was a partner in Neuse Timber Land Company. Smith served as the president of the board developing the Marine Corps Museum of the Carolinas, on the Board of BOLD, and the Board of Caring Communities. He has served on the Jacksonville USO Executive Council, and the Board of Jacksonville-Onslow Chamber of Commerce 2000–2001 He was also inducted into the Oklahoma Military Hall of Fame and received the Downeast NCOA Mack McKinney Award. He was also a member of the North Carolina Advisory Commission on Military Affairs.

Smith is the co-author, with Bing West, of The March Up: Taking Baghdad with the 1st Marine Division. The book is an eyewitness account of the 1st Marine Division's march from Kuwait to Baghdad at the beginning of the Iraq War.

Smith is a founder and currently serves as Chairman of Sandboxx, a company dedicated to providing communication and life style management tools for military members and their families.

Awards and decorations
General Smith's personal decorations include:

Publications

Notes

References

Further reading
 Recounts the lives and careers of Gen. James L. Jones, MajGen Ray L. Smith, and LtGen Martin R. Steele, from the Basic School, to Vietnam, to Iraq, to present.

External links

Living people
Year of birth missing (living people)
American military historians
American male non-fiction writers
Military personnel from Oklahoma
Recipients of the Navy Cross (United States)
Recipients of the Silver Star
Recipients of the Legion of Merit
United States Marine Corps personnel of the Vietnam War
Companions of the Distinguished Service Order
Order of National Security Merit members
Recipients of the Gallantry Cross (Vietnam)
United States Marine Corps generals
Recipients of the Defense Distinguished Service Medal
Recipients of the Navy Distinguished Service Medal